Zenobia Peak, elevation , is the highest summit in Dinosaur National Monument of Moffat County, Colorado.

See also

List of Colorado mountain ranges
List of Colorado mountain summits
List of Colorado fourteeners
List of Colorado 4000 meter prominent summits
List of the most prominent summits of Colorado
List of Colorado county high points

References

External links

Mountains of Colorado
Mountains of Moffat County, Colorado
North American 2000 m summits
Dinosaur National Monument